The Xun River (Chinese: 浔江, pinyin: Xún Jiāng, jyutping: Cham4 Gong1) is a short section of the main branch of the Pearl River system upstream from the Xi Jiang in China.  Although less than 200km long, it is of considerable importance in Guangxi Province as it drains the majority of the province.  The Xun River in name is formed by the Yu and Qian rivers, with the Qian being the greater of the two tributaries.  The Xun then flows out of Guiping and through Pingnan, finally joining with the Gui Jiang in Wuzhou to form the Xi Jiang. The Xun is also a section of the Pearl's longest tributary.

The Xun River flows from west to east roughly along the Tropic of Cancer.

References
Atlas of China, SinoMaps Press, 2007.

Rivers of Guangxi
Tributaries of the Pearl River (China)